Elections to the Baseball Hall of Fame for 1995 introduced a system of multiple classified ballots for consideration by the Veterans Committee. That group met in closed sessions as usual and selected four people:
Richie Ashburn, Leon Day, William Hulbert, and Vic Willis. Day and Hulbert were named from the new ballots for Negro leagues and 19th century figures.

The Baseball Writers' Association of America (BBWAA) voted by mail, per their usual process, to select from recent major league players; they elected Mike Schmidt. A formal induction ceremony was held in Cooperstown, New York, on July 30, 1995.

The BBWAA election 
The BBWAA was authorized to elect players active in 1975 or later, but not after 1989; the ballot included candidates from the 1994 ballot who received at least 5% of the vote but were not elected, along with selected players, chosen by a screening committee, whose last appearance was in 1990. All 10-year members of the BBWAA were eligible to vote.

Voters were instructed to cast votes for up to 10 candidates; any candidate receiving votes on at least 75% of the ballots would be honored with induction to the Hall. The ballot consisted of 39 players; a total of 460 ballots were cast, with 345 votes required for election. A total of 2,829 individual votes were cast, an average of 6.15 per ballot. Those candidates receiving less than 5% of the vote (23 votes) will not appear on future BBWAA ballots, but may eventually be considered by the Veterans Committee.

Candidates who were eligible for the first time are indicated here with a dagger (†). The one candidate who received at least 75% of the vote and was elected is indicated in bold italics; candidates who have since been elected in subsequent elections are indicated in italics. The 14 candidates who received less than 5% of the vote, thus becoming ineligible for future BBWAA consideration, are indicated with an asterisk (*).

Thurman Munson was on the ballot for the 15th and final time.

The newly-eligible players included 24 All-Stars, eleven of whom were not included on the ballot, representing a total of 67 All-Star selections. Among the new candidates were 12-time All-Star Mike Schmidt, 8-time All-Star Jim Rice and 5-time All-Star Buddy Bell. The field included three MVPs (Schmidt, Rice and Willie Hernández) and one Cy Young Award winner (Hernández).

Players eligible for the first time who were not included on the ballot were: Luis Aguayo, Neil Allen, Tony Armas, Alan Ashby, Bruce Benedict, Mike Davis, Bob Dernier, Bo Díaz, Leon Durham, Tim Flannery, Damaso Garcia, Jerry Hairston, Sr., Glenn Hubbard, Lee Mazzilli, Keith Moreland, Dwayne Murphy, David Palmer, Shane Rawley, Craig Reynolds, Harry Spilman, Bob Stanley, Tim Stoddard, Steve Trout, Ron Washington, and Joel Youngblood.

In addition to Schmidt, Phillies broadcaster and former center fielder Richie Ashburn was inducted to the hall by the Veteran's Committee. Phillie fans were elated over the results, and came to Cooperstown that July in droves.

The Veterans Committee 

The Veterans Committee met in closed sessions to elect as many as two executives, managers, umpires, and older major league players—the categories considered in all its meetings since 1953. By a new arrangement it separately considered candidates from the Negro leagues and from the 19th century with authority to select one from each of those two special ballots.

The committee elected four people, the maximum number permitted:
center fielder Richie Ashburn from the 1950s, pitcher Vic Willis from the 1900s, pitcher Leon Day from the Negro leagues, and from the 19th century William Hulbert, the founder and second president of the National League.

J. G. Taylor Spink Award 
There was no Spink Award to a baseball writer in 1995 (none voted at the December 1994 meeting at the BBWAA).

Ford C. Frick Award 
Bob Wolff
received the Ford C. Frick Award honoring a baseball broadcaster.

References

External links 
 1995 Election at www.baseballhalloffame.org.

Baseball Hall of Fame balloting
Hall of Fame balloting